Buckley Homestead Living History Farm is a county park and historical museum located at Lowell, Indiana. The park is open from 7 a.m. to sunset year round. It is listed on the National Register of Historic Places.  The park is operated by Lake County Parks.

History
The Buckleys were Irish immigrants who moved to the United States in the mid-18th century. They first moved to Northwest Indiana in 1849, where they built their first farmstead. The Buckleys ended up turning their farm into a 150-head dairy farm. They sold their milk to markets in Chicago during the early 20th century. In 1977, part of the park was donated by Rose Buckley Pearce to be part of the Lake County Parks. The Buckley Homestead was added to the National Register of Historic Places in 1984.

Features
Next to the parking area, there is a visitor center which contains restroom facilities, drinking fountains, information kiosk, and a gift shop which is open on Sunday afternoons from May through the first of August. After that, a path will lead to the Buckley's farm. The park is divided into sections: Main House Museum, School, Pioneer Farm, and Back Again.

Events and activities
Buckley Homestead holds many events throughout the season. A list of events at Buckley Homestead are listed below.

WWII Tribute

Buckley Homestead holds a World War II Tribute every year by reenacting battles between the axis and allies. The tribute holds skirmishes, axis and allies encampments, uniform demonstration, World War II Veterans Panel, and homefront displays.

Legend of Sleepy Hollow
This event is held annually. Buckley Homestead is transformed into Tarrytown, New York, popularly known as Sleepy Hollow. There, visitors walk with a guide through the homestead while encountering townsfolk in search of Ichabod Crane, the one person who can tell the stories of the village.

References

External links
Buckley Homestead - official site

Farms on the National Register of Historic Places in Indiana
Houses completed in 1853
Open-air museums in Indiana
National Register of Historic Places in Lake County, Indiana
Parks in Indiana
Museums in Lake County, Indiana
Farm museums in Indiana
Protected areas of Lake County, Indiana
1853 establishments in Indiana